Shine Tom Chacko (born 15 September 1983) is an Indian actor and former assistant director who works in Malayalam cinema. After working as an assistant to director Kamal for about 9 years, he forayed into acting through the film, Gaddama.
He played supporting roles in several films including Ee Adutha Kaalathu, Chapters, Annayum Rasoolum and Masala Republic and played his first lead role in Binu S Kalady's fantasy-comedy film Ithihasa (2014) which dealt with body-swapping.

Film career
Shine started his career as an assistant director to Kamal in the early 2000's. He has completed his B.Com degree from St. Thomas College, Thrissur. He worked nearly 10 years with Kamal and during this time, Shine had showed his face in one of the scenes as a man sitting in a bus in the 2002 film Nammal directed by Kamal. Shine made his acting debut in 2011 with Kamal's Gaddama. He portrayed the role of an immigrant, who is tortured and treated like a slave in a desert of Saudi Arabia. He played a notable role in Sunil Ibrahim's Chapters (2012). However the movie was a failure at box office. After playing some usual sidekick and other minor roles in movies such as Annayum Rasoolum (2013) and Ee Adutha Kaalathu (2012); Shine got his breakthrough with the 2014 fantasy comedy Ithihasa directed by Binu Sadanandan. Shine played the lead role in the film which deals with body swapping and it turned out to be of the highest grossing Malayalam movies in 2014. He was praised for his strong negative shade role in Kammatipaadam (2016). The same year he played a notable role in Annmariya Kalippilaanu. Shine played the lead roles as Antony in Dum and Kinder in Popcorn, both released in 2016. However, both movies were not successful at the box office.

In 2017, Shine played some notable roles in movies such as Godha, Tiyaan, Varnyathil Aashanka, Parava and Mayanadhi. Shine played the lead role in Who (2018) which is the first Malayalam movie dealing with time travel. Same year, he played a lead role in Ottakkoru Kamukan, which received mixed reviews from critics.

Shine's villainous performance in Ishq (2019) was critically acclaimed despite the movie receiving negative reviews from most critics. He portrayed Alwin, a moral police who intervenes in the privacy of a couple. The Hindu described Alwin as one of the most despicable villainous roles in Malayalam cinema of the decade. He played a lead role in the fantasy comedy Mask, which also deals with body swapping. Shine's performance in Khalid Rahman's black comedy Unda (2019) was appraised. Some critics listed Unda as one of the best Malayalam movies of the decade.

In 2020, Shine had notable roles in Bhoomiyile Manohara Swakaryam and Maniyarayile Ashokan. The same year he played the lead role in Khalid Rahman's thriller Love, which received mixed reviews. The movie had a late release in India on 29 January 2021. In 2021, he played as police officer in Operation Java and Wolf. Both movies were critically acclaimed. He also had a notable role in Anugraheethan Antony. Shine has also a notable role in the latest OTT release Kuruthi starring Prithviraj Sukumaran, Roshan Mathew and more. He further received critical acclaim and likes of the audience for his performance in Kurup 2021.

In 2022, he appeared in critically acclaimed Veyil, Bheeshma Parvam and Pada.

Shine made his Tamil debut with Beast, an action drama starring Vijay and Pooja Hegde in the lead roles.

Shine will also make his debut in Telugu with Dasara, an action drama starring Nani and Keerthy Suresh in the lead roles.

Filmography

All films are in Malayalam language unless otherwise noted.

Awards and nominations

Controversy

On 31 January 2015, Shine Tom Chacko and four women were arrested in Kochi for allegedly possessing narcotics. A case under the Narcotic Drugs and Psychotropic Substance Act was registered against him. He was later granted bail by the  High Court of Kerala.

References

External links 
 

Indian male film actors
Male actors from Kerala
Male actors in Malayalam cinema
Living people
People from Chalakudy
21st-century Indian male actors
1983 births